Carlo Piccoli (born 26 September 1970) is a former Italian paralympic swimmer who won a bronze medal at the 2004 Summer Paralympics.

References

External links
 

1970 births
Living people
Paralympic swimmers of Italy
Paralympic bronze medalists for Italy
Medalists at the 2004 Summer Paralympics
Paralympic medalists in swimming
Swimmers at the 2004 Summer Paralympics
Medalists at the World Para Swimming Championships
Italian male freestyle swimmers
S3-classified Paralympic swimmers
21st-century Italian people